Lasse Friman (born 3 November 1954) is a Finnish boxer. He competed in the men's light welterweight event at the 1976 Summer Olympics.

References

External links
 

1954 births
Living people
Finnish male boxers
Olympic boxers of Finland
Boxers at the 1976 Summer Olympics
Sportspeople from Helsinki
Light-welterweight boxers